Manfred Glöckner (18 January 1936 – 8 October 2005) was an East German slalom canoeist who competed in the 1950s and the 1960s. He won four gold medals at the ICF Canoe Slalom World Championships (Mixed C-2: 1957; C-2 team: 1959, 1963; Mixed C-2 team: 1957).

References

External links

German male canoeists
2005 deaths
1936 births
Medalists at the ICF Canoe Slalom World Championships